Olaf Heß (born 7 October 1968) is a German sports shooter. He competed in two events at the 1988 Summer Olympics.

References

External links
 

1968 births
Living people
German male sport shooters
Olympic shooters of East Germany
Shooters at the 1988 Summer Olympics
People from Saalfeld
Sportspeople from Thuringia